HMS Trespasser was a British submarine of the third group of the T class. She was built as P312 by Vickers Armstrong, Barrow, and launched on 29 May 1942. So far she has been the only ship of the Royal Navy to bear the name Trespasser.

She was one of only two T-class submarines completed without an Oerlikon 20 mm anti-aircraft gun, the other being HMS P311.

Service
Trespasser served in a number of naval theatres, home waters, the Mediterranean and the Far East during her wartime career. While on patrol in the Gulf of Lyon, she fired three torpedoes at a dead whale, having mistaken it for an enemy submarine. She also attacked the German auxiliary patrol vessel Uj 6073 / Nimeth Allah, but failed to hit her. Her luck changed when she sank the Italian auxiliary patrol vessel V8 / Filippo with gunfire. Transferred to the Pacific Far East, she torpedoed and damaged the Japanese auxiliary gunboat Eifuku Maru off Burma.

She survived the war and continued in service with the Navy, finally being scrapped at Gateshead on 26 September 1961.

References

Publications
 
 

 

British T-class submarines of the Royal Navy
Ships built in Barrow-in-Furness
1942 ships
World War II submarines of the United Kingdom
Cold War submarines of the United Kingdom